Scott Dilworth "Dill" Clarke (March 31, 1881 – December 28, 1966) was an American politician in the state of Florida. A Democrat, he served in the Florida Senate including as its president.

Clarke was born in Monticello, Florida in 1881, to Thomas L. and Daisy (Bird) Clarke and was educated at South Florida Military College and the University of Virginia after he attended local schools in his hometown. He was an attorney and bank president. Clarke served in the Florida State Senate from 1931 to 1965 as a Democratic member for the 31st district. In 1947, he was President of the Florida Senate.

References

1881 births
1966 deaths
People from Monticello, Florida
University of Virginia alumni
Businesspeople from Florida
Florida lawyers
Democratic Party Florida state senators
Pork Chop Gang
20th-century American politicians
20th-century American businesspeople
20th-century American lawyers